Ninina (minor planet designation: 357 Ninina) is a large main-belt asteroid. It was discovered by Auguste Charlois on February 11, 1893, in Nice.
The reference of its name is not known, though Ninine is a French personal name.

References

External links 
 
 

000357
Discoveries by Auguste Charlois
Named minor planets
000357
18930211